Vincent Thomas Buckley (8 July 1925 – 12 November 1988) was an Australian poet, teacher, editor, essayist and critic.

Life
Buckley was born in 1925 in Romsey, Victoria to Patrick Buckley, a carter and sometime farm labourer, and his wife Frances Margaret Buckley, née Condonto.  He attended St Patrick’s College in East Melbourne. living in a dormitory.

In 1942, Buckley worked for eight months as a clerk in the Commonwealth Department of Supply and Shipping.  On 13 December 1943, Buckley enlisted in the Royal Australian Air Force, where he served as a recorder. On 5 February 1945, after spending several months in a military hospital in Sydney, he was discharged due to a disability.

In 1946, Buckley entered University of Melbourne and on 12 July 1947, he married Edna Jean Forbes.  The couple had two daughters and later divorced.  In 1950, Buckley received a bachelor's degree from the university and in 1951 started teaching English there.  In 1954, Buckley was awarded a master's degree from the university.  That same year, he published his first poetry collection, The World’s Flesh.

In 1955, Buckley received a two-year scholarship to St. Catharine's College, Cambridge, in the United Kingdom to study the moral criticism of Matthew Arnold, F. R. Leavis and T. S. Eliot.  During this period, he was able to take side trips to Ireland.

In 1957, Buckley returned to the University of Melbourne and published his collection, Poetry: Mainly Australian.  In 1958, he was named the Lockie Fellow at the university. He edited the magazine, Prospect, from 1958 to 1964, and was the poetry editor of the Bulletin from 1961 until 1963.  In 1966, Buckley published the collection Arcady and Other Places and in 1967 held a personal Chair in Poetry at the university.

Between 1967 and 1979, Buckley lived for periods in Ireland, where he founded the Committee for Civil Rights.  In 1972, the University of Melbourne awarded him the Dublin prize. On 18 September 1976, in Middle Brighton, Buckley married Penelope Jane Curtis, a 33-year-old research student In 1982, Buckley was awarded the Christopher Brennan Award.  In 1987, due to bad health, Buckley retired from the university.

On 12 November 1988, Buckley died of a heart attack in Kew, Victoria .  He was buried in Melton Cemetery in Melton, Victoria.

In 1992, the University of Melbourne established The Vincent Buckley Poetry Prize.  Each year, it allows an Irish poet to visit Australia and an Australian poet to visit Ireland.

Themes and subject matter
Buckley's subject matter ranged from the personal to the political, with a particular interest in Irish politics, culture and history. Buckley was also heavily involved in Catholic intellectual debate during the period of the Cold War and the emergence in Australia of the Democratic Labour Party.<ref name = "RVB">[http://home.iprimus.com.au/foo7/buckley.html Romsey and Vincent Buckley (1925–1988)]</ref>

Buckley's critical writing includes volumes on poetry, the novelist Henry Handel Richardson, and Leonard French's Campion paintings.

Bibliography

 The World’s Flesh (F. W. Cheshire, 1954)
 Essays in Poetry: Mainly Australian (Melbourne University Press, 1957)
 (ed.) Australian Poetry 1958 (Angus & Robertson, 1958)
 Poetry and Morality: Studies on the Criticism of Matthew Arnold, T. S. Eliot, and F. R. Leavis (Chatto & Windus, 1959)
 Henry Handel Richardson (Oxford University Press, 1961)
 Masters in Israel:Poems (Angus and Robertson, 1961)
 (ed.) Eight by Eight: Poems (Jacaranda Press, 1963)
 Arcady and Other Places (Melbourne University Press and Cambridge University Press, 1966)
 Poetry and the Sacred (Chatto & Windus, 1968)
 Golden Builders: and Other Poems (Angus & Robertson, 1976)
 Maundy Sunlight (Open Door Press, 1975)
 Late Winter Child (Dolmen Press, 1979)
 The Pattern (Dolmen Press, 1979)
 Selected Poems (Angus & Robertson, 1981)
 
 Memory Ireland: Insights into the Contemporary Irish Condition (Penguin Books, 1985)
 Last Poems (McPhee Gribble and Penguin Books, 1991)
 (ed.) The Faber Book of Modern Australian Verse (Faber and Faber, 1991)
 Vincent Buckley: Collected Poems'' (John Leonard Press, 2009)

References

External links
Vincent Buckley Poetry Prize
 Vincent Buckley: Collected Poems at John Leonard Press
Vincent Buckley special issue of JASAL 2010

1925 births
1988 deaths
University of Melbourne alumni
Alumni of St Catharine's College, Cambridge
20th-century Australian poets
Australian male poets
Catholic poets
ALS Gold Medal winners
20th-century Australian male writers
Australian Roman Catholics
Royal Australian Air Force personnel of World War II
Military personnel from Victoria (Australia)